Markopoulo Oropou is a town and a former community of East Attica,  Greece. Since the 2011 local government reform it is part of the municipality Oropos, of which it is a municipal unit. The municipal unit has an area of 23.177 km2. 

Markopoulo Oropou is situated 3 km south of the South Euboean Gulf coast. It is 4 km southeast of Nea Palatia and 35 km north of Athens city center. The municipal unit Markopoulo Oropou consists of the town Markopoulo and the villages Neo Livyssi, Agia Varvara and Bafi.

Historical population

The village has historically been an Arvanite settlement.

References

External links
 GTP Travel Pages (Community)

Oropos
Populated places in East Attica
Arvanite settlements